In computer metadata, semantic equivalence is a declaration that two data elements from different vocabularies contain data that has similar meaning.  There are three types of semantic equivalence statements:

 Class or concept equivalence.  A statement that two high level concepts have similar or equivalent meaning.
 Property or attribute equivalence.  A statement that two properties, descriptors or attributes of classes have similar meaning.
 Instance equivalence.  A statement that two instances of data are the same or refer to the same instance.

Example

Assume that there are two organizations, each having a separate data dictionary.  The first organization has a data element entry:

  <DataElement>
     PersonFamilyName
     The name of a person shared with other members of their family.
  <DataElement>

and a second organization has a data dictionary with a data element with the following entry:

  <DataElement>
     IndividualLastName
     The name of an individual person shared with other members of their family.
  <DataElement>

these two data elements can be considered to have the same meaning and can be marked as semantically equivalent.

See also

 Logical equivalence
 Metadata
 Vocabulary-based transformation
 Web Ontology Language (OWL)

References

 World Wide Web OWL Language Reference
 Universal Data Element Framework Web Site  Semantic Equivalency for Standards and Integrations

External links

 OWL definition of Class Equivalency
 OWL definition of Property Equivalency

Metadata
Semantics